Almaguin Highlands Secondary School (AHSS) is an English public high school located in Strong, Ontario between the towns of South River, Ontario and Sundridge, Ontario. The school is part of the Near North District School Board and is responsible for the education of students in grades 9–12 in the east side of the Parry Sound District (also known as the "Almaguin Highlands"), the school serves 19 small communities and townships.

Students and Athletes at AHSS are known as Highlanders, the schools colours are dark green, black, & gold.

Almaguin Highlands Secondary School was founded in 1959, the new and currently used school building was founded in September 2011.

History

The Old School 

AHSS (known then as Sundridge-South River Secondary School) was originally built to replace Sundridge High School, Sundridge and South River High School, South River. In the early 1960s the building underwent a giant expansion (bigger addition then the size of the original school) to become Almaguin Highlands Secondary School, this new school also eliminated the need of Burk's Falls High School, Burk's Falls and Powassan High School, Powassan. This new school had a reach from Nipissing in the north to Magnetawan in the West and Novar in the south, including all area between.

The New School 

In the mid 2000s (Around the school's 50th Anniversary) planning for a replacement high school for the area arose. This was cause to the old school having problems with asbestos as well as the building becoming dated with many repairs and upgrades needed. With the help of a government grant the new building began construction in early 2010.

The new school was finished construction in September 2011, causing students to be delayed by one week starting the new school year. The new school is significantly smaller in size then the old school was (New buildings capacity around 850 where the old school could hold 2000+) When it opened the school was missing bleachers in the gym, slide out auditorium seats in the cafetorium (a combination room of the cafeteria and an auditorium), a soccer field, a running track, track & field jumping pits, and only a plywood deck on the stage. During the 2011–2012 school year fundraising allowed the building of the bleachers and auditorium seats. Due to having no field students during gym classes, home soccer games, and track & field still took place at the old school, leaving the students to be bused over to the old site. During the 2014–2015 school year the soccer field was constructed, ready for use in fall 2015. Over the 2015 summer break the stage deck was also replaced to proper decking. As of right now the school is still lacking a functioning running track and jumping pits, but students are no longer bused to the old school.

Feeder Schools 
AHSS is fed by the following feeder schools:

Full Feeder Schools 
 Argyle Public School (K-8), Port Loring
 Evergreen Heights Education Centre (K-8), Emsdale (Perry) 
 Land of Lakes Public School (K-8, 5-8 Extended French), Burk's Falls 
 Magnetawan Central School (K-8), Magnetawan 
 Mapleridge Public School (K-8), Powassan 
 South River Public School (K-8), South River 
 South Shore Education Centre (K-8), Nipissing 
 Sundridge Centennial Public School (K-8), Sundridge

Athletics 
AHSS is a part of the Muskoka-Parry Sound(MPS) & Georgian Bay (GBSSA) athletic areas.

Fall Sports 
 Junior Boys Soccer 
 Senior Boys Soccer
 Junior Boys Volleyball
 Senior Boys Volleyball
 Midget Boys Cross Country
 Junior Boys Cross Country
 Senior Boys Cross Country
 Junior Girls Basketball
 Senior Girls Basketball
 Midget Girls Cross Country
 Junior Girls Cross Country
 Senior Girls Cross Country

Winter Sports 
 Junior Boys Basketball
 Senior Boys Basketball
 Midget Boys Nordic Skiing
 Junior Boys Nordic Skiing
 Senior Boys Nordic Skiing
 Varsity Boys Ice Hockey
 Midget Girls Volleyball
 Junior Girls Volleyball
 Senior Girls Volleyball
 Midget Girls Nordic Skiing
 Junior Girls Nordic Skiing
 Senior Girls Nordic Skiing
 Varsity Girls Ice Hockey

Spring Sports 
 Varsity Girls Soccer
 Co-Ed Track & Field
 Co-Ed Badminton

Arts

Drama 
AHSS offers drama programming in grades 9 through 12. It also offers advanced drama programing, as 'Play Production' courses at the 11th and 12th grade.

The AHSS  Drama club, known as Tartan Theatre, produces 2-3 plays each school year, and participates in the National Theatre School Ontario Drama Festival (formerly Sears Ontario Drama Festival). It is part of the Nipissing District and Northern Region. Tartan Theatre has had multiple plays advance to the Provincial Showcase, most recently with Elephant's Graveyard in 2015. Other productions apart of provincial showcases include Lessons of Childhood (2013), Women of Troy (2010), Moon People (2003), and Salt Water Moon (1999).

In 2016 Tartan Theatre was selected to take part in the Southern Ontario Youth Theatre Festival (now Ontario Youth Theatre Festival) with The Comedian.

Academics

Extended French Program 
AHSS offers an Extended French Certificate Program where students can take intensive courses on the French language as well as content courses offered in French. Students in the program will graduate with an Extended French Certificate on their OSSD. It is not a bilingualism certification, but starting in 2017 students in their fourth year of the program can take the DELF French Language Test.

Specialist High Skills Majors 
AHSS offers three Specialist High Skills Majors (SHSMs) which students can apply for in the tenth grade. They are Environment - Outdoor Education, Design and Technology, and Health and Wellness.

Dual Credits and Apprenticeships 
AHSS offers many Dual Credits and Apprenticeships programs through Canadore College in which students can earn credits towards their OSSD and a college degree, diploma, or certificate. Typically, the dual credits program is paired with the COOP program.

Notable alumni 

 Peter Camani, artist and sculptor, retired art teacher, art is featured in the Vatican and Buckingham Palace. His creations, such as the Screaming Heads and Midlothian Castle & Gallery have been featured on many television shows.
 Hawksley Workman, rock singer-songwriter.

References

High schools in Ontario
Educational institutions established in 1959
1959 establishments in Ontario